Kisona Selvaduray (born 1 October 1998) is a Malaysian badminton player. She was the bronze medalist at the 2013 Asian Youth Games in the girls' singles event. She won her first senior international title at the Indonesia International Series tournament in the women's singles event.

Career 
In 2013, Kisona won the bronze medal at the Asian Youth Games beating compatriot Ho Yen Mei in the bronze medal match.

Kisona won her first senior international title at the 2017 Indonesia International, and then won back-to-back Malaysia International Series in 2017 and 2018.

In 2019, Kisona won the International Series event in Greece and Sydney. In December, she won the gold medal in the women's singles at the 2019 Southeast Asian Games.

In 2021, Kisona manage to win her first International Challenge title, winning the Spanish International  by beating Goh Jin Wei in the final. She was part of the Malaysia team that finished in the semi finals at the 2021 Sudirman Cup. On 19 December 2022, Academy Badminton Malaysia (ABM) singles coaching director, Wong Choong Hann announced Kisona's resignation from the national set up at the ABM to focus on her recovery and will continue playing as a professional.

Injuries
In 2014, she suffered a torn anterior cruciate ligament (ACL) at the World Junior Championships in Alor Setar, and was forced to undergo surgery a year later. She also sustained a medial collateral ligament (MCL) and a posterior cruciate ligament (PCL) injury on the right knee.

Personal life 
Kisona was born in Seremban, Negeri Sembilan to S. Valarmathi and police officer, A. Selvaduray. She is the youngest of four siblings.  She is fluent in four languages - Tamil, Bahasa Malaysia, English and Mandarin. Due to her fluency in Mandarin, she was invited to join the Negeri Sembilan Chinese Recreational Club (NSCRC) after winning the 2019 SEA Games gold medal.

Achievements

Southeast Asian Games 
Women's singles

Asian Youth Games 
Girls' singles

BWF International Challenge/Series (6 titles) 
Women's singles

  BWF International Challenge tournament
  BWF International Series tournament
  BWF Future Series tournament

References

External links 
 Kisona Selvaduray at BAM.org.my
 

1998 births
Living people
People from Negeri Sembilan
Malaysian female badminton players
Malaysian people of Tamil descent
Malaysian sportspeople of Indian descent
Competitors at the 2019 Southeast Asian Games
Southeast Asian Games gold medalists for Malaysia
Southeast Asian Games bronze medalists for Malaysia
Southeast Asian Games medalists in badminton
21st-century Malaysian women